Operation Glade was a Metropolitan Police Service investigation into allegations of possible corruption in the police service.

It was John Boyall's role at  The News of the World which first encouraged the police to start Operation Glade's investigation into the dubious practices at the newspaper concerning the hacking of peoples mobile phones and text messages.
9 victims were said to be eligible for payouts are: 
 the former MP George Galloway,
 the former director of the Football Association David Davies,
 the comic actor Steve Coogan,
 the former football executive Mick McGuire,
 the jockey Kieren Fallon,
 the consultant Mary-Ellen Field,
 the personal assistant Ben Jackson,
 the actor Leslie Ash.

See also 
 Operation Weeting
 Operation Motorman
 News International phone hacking scandal
 Metropolitan police role in phone hacking scandal
 Phone hacking scandal reference lists

References 

Glade
2003 in the United Kingdom
News International phone hacking scandal